The United States Coast Guard Reserve is the reserve component of the United States Coast Guard. It is organized, trained, administered, and supplied under the direction of the Commandant of the Coast Guard through the Assistant Commandant for Reserve (CG-R).

Mission
The mission of the Coast Guard Reserve is stated in the Reserve Policy Statement issued in 2018:
Serving as the Coast Guard's only dedicated surge force the Reserve Component is a contingency-based workforce, trained locally and deployed globally to provide appropriately trained personnel to meet mission requirements within the prioritized focus areas of Defense Operations, Ports, Waterways, and Coastal Security, Incident Response and Management, & Mission Support.

History

The United States Coast Guard Reserve was originally established on 23 June 1939 as a civilian reserve. This civilian reserve was renamed the United States Coast Guard Auxiliary on the passage of the Coast Guard Reserve and Auxiliary Act of 19 February 1941 and the military reserve commenced operations at that time.

World War II
Persons joining the Coast Guard after 1 February 1942 were signed on as regular reservists and were obligated to serve for "the duration plus six" months. These reservists served in every type of job that the Coast Guard had been tasked. Other volunteers and Coast Guard Auxiliary members formed what was termed the temporary reserve and they generally served without pay, receiving only reimbursement for fuel expenses on their privately owned boats to perform coastal patrols and port security.

Because all of the personnel inducted in the Coast Guard after the start of the war were reservists, only 8% of the 214,000 Coast Guardsmen that served during World War II were non-reservists. An additional 125,000 temporary reservists also contributed to the war effort. At the end of the war most reservists were released to inactive duty or discharged.

Cold War period
Due to increased tensions during the Korean War period, Congress authorized funding of the first Coast Guard reserve units.  The first units were known as Organized Reserve Training Unit, Port Security (ORTUPS) and consisted of reserve officers and enlisted training in port security operations. Meetings were generally held once a week for 4 hours on a week night.  Four hours paid the reservist the equivalent of one day's pay for active duty Coast Guardsmen.  There were 35 ORTUPS Units and 8300 reservists serving by July 1951.

During the Vietnam War period and shortly thereafter, the Coast Guard considered abandoning the reserve program, but the force was instead reoriented into force augmentation. The Coast Guard Reserve reached its peak strength of 17,815 in 1969, during the Vietnam War.

Post-Vietnam War events

Mobilizations
In 1973 women were integrated into the active-duty Coast Guard and the Coast Guard Reserve. The SPARS ended and those in it were sent to the reserve.

Also in 1973 the reserve exercised its first involuntary recall in support of flood operations in the Midwest. The next involuntary recall was in support of the Mariel Boat Lift exodus from Cuba in 1980. Reserve units were increasingly used to augment regular Coast Guard operations during the 1980s but the mission of the Reserves was still training for mobilization. Port Security Units (PSU) were formed during this time period and are made up of a small active duty element that handles the daily unit administration duties and a hundred or more reservists to complete the unit roster. Most of the enlisted reservists in a PSU are in the maritime enforcement specialist (ME) rating; a new rating as of 1 January 2010 that includes both active and reserve personnel. The ME rating was the old port security specialist (PS) rating, a reserve only rating that was integrated into the ME rating. Other rates assigned to the PSU's include boatswains mate (BM), machinery technician (MK), gunners mate (GM), yeoman (YN), storekeeper (SK), and health services technician (HS).

In 1990, the first PSU was called up to active duty to support Operation Desert Shield and Operation Desert Storm. Various PSU's have taken turns rotating in and out of Southwest Asia since that time.

Team Coast Guard
1994 saw the restructuring of the reserve program with the advent of the "Team Coast Guard" concept. This led to the disestablishment of most reserve units and the assignment of the reservists to active duty commands. As a result, reservists work very closely with their active duty counterparts, the Coast Guard Auxiliary, and Coast Guard civilians as they augment the resources of active duty commands. PSUs are the only remaining reserve units, as all other reservists are assigned to active duty commands.

While reservists provide high-value augmentation of active duty forces to assist in accomplishing everyday missions, each reservist must continually balance augmentation duties with readiness for mobilization. Since 11 September 2001, over 8,500 reservists have been activated.

Recent events
In 1997, a memorandum of understanding was signed between the New York Naval Militia and the U.S. Coast Guard, permitting Coast Guard reservists to serve in the New York Naval Militia, while simultaneously continuing their service in the Coast Guard Reserve.

The Commandant staff has recently developed a plan for support that "optimizes the organization, administration, recruiting, instruction, training, and readiness of the Coast Guard Reserve" known as Reserve Force Readiness System (RFRS). This program will improve the administrative and training readiness of the reserve force. The plans for improvements in funding and full-time support billets for the reserve force are being evaluated during 2009 and full implementation will be phased in over the next four years.

In 2000, the Coast Guard Reserve was deployed to the Middle East in response to the USS Cole bombing. The Coast Guard Reserve was also activated in response to the September 11 attacks and Hurricane Katrina during the early to mid 2000s. The Coast Guard Reserve's most recent deployments were responses to the 2010 Haiti earthquake, the Deepwater Horizon oil spill and Hurricane Sandy as well as Hurricane Ian.

Organization
The Coast Guard reservist normally trains two days a month and may perform up to 12 days of Active Duty for Training (ADT) a year. The Coast Guard Reserve has 6,293 men and women in service, most of them integrated directly with regular Coast Guard units.

See also
United States Coast Guard
SPARS
Women in the United States Coast Guard
Army National Guard (U.S. Army)
United States Army Reserve
United States Marine Corps Reserve
United States Navy Reserve
Air National Guard (U.S. Air Force)
Air Force Reserve Command (U.S. Air Force)

Notes
Footnotes

Citations

References

External links

The Reservist magazine
U.S. Coast Guard Recruiting - Reserve opportunities

Coast Guard Reserve
United States Coast Guard